Leroy "Flash" Miller (born 1910) is an American former Negro league infielder who played in the 1930s and 1940s.

A native of Lockett, Virginia, Miller made his Negro leagues debut with the Newark Dodgers in 1934. He played for Newark again the following season, then spent six seasons with the New York Black Yankees between 1938 and 1945.

References

External links
 and Seamheads

1910 births
Date of birth missing
Year of death missing
New York Black Yankees players
Newark Dodgers players